Lauria is a town and comune of the province of Potenza, in Basilicata, southern Italy, situated near the borders of Calabria. It is a walled, medieval town on the steep side of a hill, with another portion  of municipal territory in the plain below.

It is historically the largest city in the southwestern Lucania region.

History
The original nucleus of the city appeared probably in the 10th century, near the place where later the Sanctuary of Madonna dell'Armo was edificated. However it seems that monastic activity pre-existed in the area, as Lauria just means the "lavra city". The Castle of Lauria, later attributed to Roger of Lauria, was built by Saracens. In the 12th century Lauria was the seat of a Norman fief, which was held by Gibel and then by his son Richard of Lauria, who died in the battle of Benevento on 1266.

His son Roger of Lauria was a famous admiral of the 13th century.

In 1806 the city was destroyed and the population slaughtered by the French soldiers under general André Masséna, as punishment for having supported the Bourbon kings.

Geography
Located in southern Basilicata and included in the Appennino Lucano - Val d'Agri - Lagonegrese National Park, Lauria is a hill town divided into a pair of districts (in italian, "rioni"): the upper one named "rione superiore" (in ancient times, "Castello", because the presence of its castle) and the lower one named "rione inferiore" (formerly "Borgo"). The municipality borders with Castelluccio Superiore, Castelsaraceno, Lagonegro, Laino Borgo, Latronico, Moliterno, Nemoli, Tortora  and Trecchina.

Main sights

The remains of the Castle (13th century)
The Sanctuary of the Assunta
The Mother Church of St. Nicholas
The church of St. James (15th century)
The Convent of Immacolata (16th century), with a noteworthy cloister

Transport
Lauria is not served by a near airport, anyway the nearest airport is Salerno-Pontecagnano  from Lauria. Other airports are Lamezia Terme and Napoli-Capodichino.

The town is served by the A2 motorway Salerno-Reggio Calabria, at the exits "Lauria Nord" and "Lauria Sud" and, until the closure in 1979, by the Lagonegro–Castrovillari-Spezzano Albanese railway.

People
Roger of Lauria – admiral
Francesco Lorenzo Brancati di Lauria
Domenico Lentini – priest
Rocco Papaleo – actor, film director and singer
Giovanni Pittella – politician

References

External links

Official website 
Lauria on comuni-italiani.it 

Cities and towns in Basilicata